Glinica  is a village in the administrative district of Gmina Żukowice, within Głogów County, Lower Silesian Voivodeship, in south-western Poland.

References

Villages in Głogów County